Bay Area most commonly refers to the San Francisco Bay Area, the urban area surrounding the San Francisco Bay in Northern California.

Bay Area may also refer to:
Guangdong-Hong Kong-Macau Greater Bay Area, an area around Guangdong, Macau and Hong Kong
Monterey Bay Area, an area around Monterey Bay, California
Tampa Bay area, an area around Tampa Bay, Florida
Galveston Bay Area, an area around Galveston Bay, Texas